Celebrities Nightclub, or simply Celebrities, is a gay bar and nightclub in Vancouver, British Columbia, Canada. The club opened in 1978, and underwent a $1 million renovation in 2013.

The venue is recognized by the Vancouver Heritage Foundation.

References

1978 establishments in Canada
LGBT culture in Vancouver
LGBT nightclubs in Canada
Nightclubs in Vancouver